Marale is a municipality in the department of Francisco Morazán, Honduras.

Location
Marale is bordered on the north by the municipality of Yoro, south by the municipalities of El Porvenir and San Ignacio, to the east by the municipalities of Mangulile, Yocón and Orica, and west by the municipalities of Sulaco, Yorito and San José del Potrero. It is surrounded by several ranges of hills, known as El Portillo, La Loma de la Cruz and Mud Loma.

History
Marale was founded in 1820, and in 1889 became one of the municipalities of the Cedros District.

Villages
The municipality of Marale encompasses the following eleven villages:
 Marale (county seat)
 El Carrizal
 El Panal
 El Paraíso
 La Esperanza o El Cacao
 La Travesía
 Las Casitas
 Las Lagunas
 Los Naranjos
 Los Planes
 Río Abajo

Economy
The main source of livelihood in the parish is agriculture, especially the production of corn and beans.

Culture
The parish is mainly Roman Catholic. 
The new year is marked with the celebration of La Feria, in honour of Cristo negro (Black Christ).

References

Populated places in Honduras